Patricia Francourt is a Seychellois banker serving as their Minister of Employment and Social Affairs.  She was sworn in on 3 November 2020.

References

Living people
Women government ministers of Seychelles
Women bankers
Year of birth missing (living people)